Ian H. Brown OBE MIBiol is a British virologist.

References

External links 
https://aphascience.blog.gov.uk/author/ian-brown/

Living people
Year of birth missing (living people)
British virologists
Members of the Order of the British Empire
Place of birth missing (living people)